National Association Grounds was a baseball grounds in Cleveland, Ohio, located at Central Avenue and East 55th Street. It was home to the Cleveland Forest Citys of the National Association in 1871 and 1872, with Cleveland winning five of its sixteen home games. It is considered a major league ballpark by those who count the National Association as a major league.

After many years of use as an amateur baseball field, a new team dubbed Cleveland Forest City moved to the NA Grounds, as members of the short-lived United States Baseball League in 1912. The USL lasted a barely a month before disbanding.

References 
Retrosheet. "Park Directory". Retrieved 2006-09-04.

Sports venues in Cleveland
Defunct baseball venues in the United States
Baseball venues in Ohio
United States Baseball League venues
Cleveland Forest Citys
Defunct sports venues in Ohio